Kottayam Lok Sabha constituency is one of the 20 Lok Sabha (parliamentary) constituencies in Kerala state in southern India.

Assembly segments

Kottayam Lok Sabha constituency is composed of the following assembly segments:

Members of Parliament

Election results

General election 2019

Elected MP Thomas Chazhikadan switched to LDF alliance as he sided with Jose K Mani after the Split in Kerala Congress in 2020.

General election 2014

General election 2009

General election 2004

General election 1999

General election 1998

General election 1996

General election 1991

General election 1989

See also
 Kottayam district
 2019 Indian general election
 Indian general election, 2019 (Kerala)
 List of Constituencies of the Lok Sabha

References

External links
 Election Commission of India: https://web.archive.org/web/20081218010942/http://www.eci.gov.in/StatisticalReports/ElectionStatistics.asp
Kottayam Lok Sabha Elections Asianet News survey results 2019

Lok Sabha constituencies in Kerala
Politics of Kottayam district